Brittany Amber Howard  (born October 2, 1988) is an American musician, singer, and songwriter known for being the lead vocalist, rhythm guitarist, and main songwriter of rock bands Alabama Shakes, Thunderbitch, and Bermuda Triangle. Her work with Alabama Shakes has garnered her nine Grammy Award nominations including Best New Artist and Album of the Year for Sound & Color. They eventually won four awards including Best Alternative Music Album.

In 2018, Alabama Shakes announced they were going on hiatus. During this time, Howard released her debut studio album as a solo artist, Jaime, in 2019. The work received critical acclaim and earned her seven Grammy nominations, winning Best Rock Song for "Stay High".

Early life
Howard was born in Athens, Alabama, one of two daughters born to Christi (née Carter) and K. J. Howard. Her mother is white, of English and Irish ancestry, while her father is African American. The family's home was in a junk yard, and once burned down due to a lightning strike. She learned to write poetry and play the piano from her older sister Jaime, who died from retinoblastoma in 1998; Howard got the same affliction but survived with partial blindness in one eye. Her parents separated soon after. She began playing the guitar at age 13, and was enamored with albums by Dionne Warwick and Elvis Presley, which she listened to repeatedly, and was inspired to write song lyrics.

Howard attended East Limestone High School, where she met future Alabama Shakes bassist Zac Cockrell. In high school, Howard began listening to 1970s rock music, such as Black Sabbath and Pink Floyd. "I’d be in the back of this Buick and be like ‘What's this? This is really cool’ and my friends told me it was Pink Floyd and I was like ‘Whoa’, it blew my mind. I started getting into all the classic rock stuff, like Yes, Cream, all that stuff."

After high school, Howard worked for the United States Postal Service until becoming a full-time musician as lead singer of Alabama Shakes.

Career

Brittany Howard is best known as the lead singer and guitarist for the American rock band Alabama Shakes. The band formed under the name "The Shakes" when Howard and bassist Zac Cockrell began playing covers and original songs together with drummer Steve Johnson. Guitarist Heath Fogg later rounded out the lineup, and the band began playing shows at bars in Alabama and recording their debut album, Boys & Girls. They went on to sign a record deal with ATO Records and released Boys & Girls in 2012 which received critical acclaim and multiple Grammy Award nominations.

In April 2015, Alabama Shakes released their second album, Sound & Color. It debuted at number one on the Billboard 200, and received favorable reviews from the music press. The band went on to perform on multiple late night shows, including Saturday Night Live, The Tonight Show Starring Jimmy Fallon, and The Late Show with Stephen Colbert. Howard was featured in the musical medley alongside Mavis Staples, Stephen Colbert, Ben Folds, and more in the series premiere of The Late Show with Stephen Colbert. At Lollapalooza in 2015, Howard was invited on stage to perform a duet of "Get Back" with Paul McCartney. Howard also performed at the ceremony for Eddie Murphy's Mark Twain Prize. In 2015, Howard was named the recipient of Billboard's Women in Music "Powerhouse" Award.

Howard is also the lead singer of the rock band Thunderbitch, formed in Nashville in 2012 with members of Clear Plastic Masks and ATO Records labelmates Fly Golden Eagle. The band surprise-released a self-titled album in September 2015. Although the band rarely makes live appearances, they did play a rare set at ATO Records' CMJ Music Marathon showcase in October 2015.

Brittany Howard is also a singer in the band Bermuda Triangle with Jesse Lafser and Becca Mancari, which was formed in Nashville in 2017. Their debut live performance was on July 12, 2017 at the Basement East in Nashville. The trio released their first single on September 6, 2017, titled "Rosey", which was first released on Jesse Lafser's 2015 album "Raised On The Plains". Although originally believed to be a one time performance, the trio performed a five show tour through the Southern states of America in October 2017. This small tour included shows in Carrboro and Asheville, North Carolina; Birmingham, Alabama; Atlanta, Georgia; and Knoxville, Tennessee.

In June 2019, Brittany Howard announced a debut solo album, Jaime which was released on September 20, 2019, as well as a tour across North America and Europe. Jaime was received with universal acclaim, with Pitchfork noting "The exceptional solo debut from the Alabama Shakes singer-songwriter is a thrilling opus that pushes the boundaries of voice, sound, and soul to new extremes." On July 16, 2019, Howard released the music video to the single Stay High, featuring actor Terry Crews lip-syncing to the track. On April 15, 2020, Howard released a cover of a Funkadelic's 1971 song "You and Your Folks, Me and My Folks" and a new rendition of her song "Stay High". Stay High was recommended as an appropriate musical remedy to get people through bad lockdown and quarantine feelings.

Influences
Howard has cited as influences artists including Led Zeppelin, Sister Rosetta Tharpe, Prince, Curtis Mayfield, David Bowie, Mavis Staples, Tom Waits, Björk, Gil Scott-Heron, Freddie Mercury, and Tina Turner.

Personal life
Howard came out as a lesbian at age 25. In 2018, Howard married Jesse Lafser, her bandmate in the Bermuda Triangle Band.

Awards and nominations

Discography

Studio albums

Remix albums

Extended plays

Singles

As lead artist

As featured artist

Other charted songs

Other appearances

With Alabama Shakes

Boys & Girls (2012)
Sound & Color (2015)

With Thunderbitch
Thunderbitch (2015)

Notes

References

External links

1988 births
African-American guitarists
African-American rock musicians
African-American rock singers
American women rock singers
American people of African descent
American people of English descent
American people of Irish descent
ATO Records artists
Living people
LGBT people from Alabama
American lesbian musicians
Singers from Alabama
People from Athens, Alabama
American rock guitarists
Grammy Award winners
Guitarists from Alabama
21st-century American women singers
21st-century American women guitarists
21st-century American guitarists
American LGBT singers
LGBT African Americans
21st-century American singers
20th-century LGBT people
21st-century LGBT people
African-American women musicians
21st-century African-American women singers
20th-century African-American people
20th-century African-American women